Igor Bakalov (9 December 1939 – 25 September 1992) was a Soviet sports shooter. He competed at the 1964 Summer Olympics and the 1972 Summer Olympics. He was associated with clubs Dynamo Minsk and SK VS Minsk.

References

1939 births
1992 deaths
Soviet male sport shooters
Belarusian male sport shooters
Olympic shooters of the Soviet Union
Shooters at the 1964 Summer Olympics
Shooters at the 1972 Summer Olympics
Sportspeople from Yekaterinburg
Sportspeople from Minsk
Honoured Masters of Sport of the USSR